Guillermo Stábile (17 January 1905 – 26 December 1966) was an Argentine professional football player and manager who played as a centre forward. At club level, Stábile won two national championships with Huracán and played in Italy and France. He was the top scorer of 1930 World Cup, the inaugural iteration of the tournament. As manager, he led Argentina to victory at six South American Championships and Racing Club to three league titles.

Club career

Early career
Stábile was born in Parque Patricios, Buenos Aires. He began his career with local club Sportivo Metán and from 1920, with Huracán. In 1924, he progressed to the first team which played in Argentina's top league, which then still had amateur status. He started out on the right wing but soon evolved into a centre forward. Stábile won many competitions with Huracán, most notably the championships of 1925 and 1928 and the regional trophy Copa Dr. Carlos Ibarguren in 1925.

Genoa
After capturing the world's attention with his impressive feats in the First World Cup, he was signed by Genoa. He instantly became a fan favourite, scoring a hat-trick on his debut against rivals Bologna. He stayed with the Genoan club for five years, playing 41 games and scoring 16 goals.

Napoli
During the 1935–36 season, he moved to Napoli with Antonio Vojak transferring the other way to Genoa. This was during the era where with Attila Sallustro another South American legend played for Napoli. The club finished 8th in the league with Stábile scoring three goals in twenty games.

Red Star Paris
As a last act of his playing career, Stábile moved to Red Star Paris in Paris, the club founded by Jules Rimet, who took the initiative to the FIFA World Cup, first played in 1930. He stayed with the club until 1939 with the last honour of his playing career being helping the club achieve promotion, from Division 2 back into Division 1. He also served as player-manager for the club.

International career

Stábile made his debut for the Argentina national team at the age of 25, in his team's second match in the first ever FIFA World Cup held in 1930 in Uruguay. He did not play in Argentina's first match of the competition against France.

His debut came in the following game against Mexico, because the first choice striker Roberto Cherro couldn't play due to an anxiety attack. The game finished 6–3 to Argentina, with Stábile scoring a hat-trick on his debut. This was long thought to be the first World Cup hat-trick, until 76 years later on 10 November 2006 world football's governing body FIFA declared that Bert Patenaude had scored the first hat-trick two days prior to Stábile.

The final game of the group stages saw Argentina facing South American rivals Chile. They won the game 3–1 with Stábile scoring twice, meaning that Argentina had qualified for the semi-finals, against the United States. The South Americans breezed through, with a 6–1 victory; Stábile added two more goals to his account and securing Argentina a place in the finals.

On 30 July 1930, the first ever World Cup final took place, between Argentina and Uruguay. At half time Argentina led 2–1, Stábile having scored the second goal. However, they went on to lose 4–2.

Despite losing the final, Stábile made history, becoming the top scorer in the first ever FIFA World Cup, with his tally of 8 goals in 4 games. It turned out that he would never play for Argentina again, and thus he scored in every game he played for his country, with an average of two goals per match.

International goals
Scores and results list Argentina's goal tally first, score column indicates score after each Stábile goal.

Managerial career

Stábile had received his first taste of managing, way back in the 1931–32 season at Genoa, long before he retired from playing. Here he spent the aforementioned season as a co-manager, alongside Luigi Burlando.

After a year at Red Star Paris, he became player-manager for the club; this included the season in which they were promoted from Ligue 2. Stábile left the French club, to coach the Argentina national team. He began his spell in 1939.

Stábile coached Argentina to six South American Championship trophies: in 1941, 1945, 1946, 1947, 1955 and 1957. After the first round exit at the 1958 World Cup, where Argentina lost the last of its three matches with 1–6 to Czechoslovakia, his time with the national side came to a halt. He was called back to the helm of Argentina in 1960 and he led Argentina in the third and last edition of the Panamerican Football Championship, which took place in Costa Rica.

With the Argentina national side, as a coach (just as he had as a player) Stábile, set records; he coached the national team in 123 official matches gaining 83 victories, making him one of the few coaches with more than 100 international matches in charge.

While managing the national side, he also had spells coaching three other clubs, first the club where he began his career, Huracán and then later Ferro and Racing Club. He led Racing to three consecutive championships between 1949 and 1951.

Stábile retired from management in 1960 to take up the role of director of the Argentina national school of football managing, a post he held, until his death in 1966.

Honours

Player
Huracán
 Primera División: 1925, 1928
 Copa Ibarguren: 1925

Individual
 FIFA World Cup Golden Boot: 1930
 FIFA World Cup All-Star Team: 1930

Manager
Racing Club
 Primera División: 1949, 1950, 1951

Argentina
 South American Championship (6): 1941, 1945, 1946, 1947, 1955, 1957
 Pan American Games: 1951, 1955 
 Panamerican Championship: 1960

Individual
 Berlin-Britz Manager of the Decade (1940s)

References

External links

 

1905 births
1966 deaths
1930 FIFA World Cup players
Footballers from Buenos Aires
Argentine people of Italian descent
Argentine footballers
Association football forwards
Argentina international footballers
Argentine expatriate footballers
Club Atlético Huracán footballers
S.S.C. Napoli players
Genoa C.F.C. players
Serie A players
Expatriate footballers in Italy
Argentine expatriate sportspeople in Italy
Argentine football managers
Estudiantes de La Plata managers
Club Atlético Huracán managers
Ferro Carril Oeste managers
Racing Club de Avellaneda managers
Red Star F.C. players
Ligue 1 players
Expatriate footballers in France
Argentine expatriate sportspeople in France
Genoa C.F.C. managers
Red Star F.C. managers
San Lorenzo de Almagro managers
Serie A managers
Argentina national football team managers
1958 FIFA World Cup managers
Burials at La Chacarita Cemetery